Rollercoaster is the second album released by the Randy Rogers Band, an American country music group. The first single, "Tonight's Not The Night", peaked at #43 on the  Billboard Hot Country Songs charts.

"This Time Around" was written with Cross Canadian Ragweed's lead singer, Cody Canada. It was later released as a single from their 2005 album Garage. Canada also wrote "Again".

Track listing
"Down & Out" (Randy Rogers) – 4:03
"Somebody Take Me Home" (Radney Foster, Rogers) – 3:31
"This Time Around" (Cody Canada, Rogers) – 4:33
"Love Must Follow You Around" (Foster, Rogers) – 4:39
"Lay It All on You" (Wade Bowen, Rogers) – 3:45
"Tonight's Not The Night (For Goodbye)" (Foster, Rogers) – 4:50
"Again" (Canada, Rogers) – 3:21
"Can't Slow Down" (Rogers) – 4:41
"They Call It the Hill Country" (Kent Finlay) – 5:23
"Ten Miles Deep" (Jon Richardson) – 3:19
"I Miss You With Me (Bonus Track – "Like It Used to Be") (Rogers) – 9:18

References
Allmusic

Randy Rogers Band albums
2004 albums